Hinduism in Vietnam is mainly observed by the ethnic Cham people. Balamon Cham is one of two surviving non-Indic indigenous Hindu peoples.

Cham Hindus

The majority of Cham are Muslim, but the Cham of Vietnam (also known as the Eastern Cham) are more diverse in their religious beliefs unlike their Cambodian counterparts who are largely Muslim. In Vietnam, Hindu Chams who are known as Balamon or Ahier Chams who make up a significant population of the Chams in Vietnam. Hindu Chams are called Balamon (Bani) Cham or Balamon Hindu. They practice a form of Shaivite Hinduism. The number of Balamon Cham Hindus in Vietnam were declared at 64,547 (36%) out of a total Cham population of 178,948 according to the 2019 population census.  
The Mariamman Temple is one of the most notable Tamil Hindu temples in Ho Chi Minh City. Ninh Thuan and Binh Thuan Provinces are where most of the Cham ethnic group (≈65%) in Vietnam reside according to the last population census. Cham Balamon (Hindu Cham) in Ninh Thuan numbered 32,000 in 2002 inhabiting 15 of 22 Cham villages. 

Cham Hindus believe that when they die, the sacred bull Nandi comes to take their soul to the holy land of India. The main festival of Cham Hindus is the Kate festival, or Mbang Kate. It is celebrated for 3 days at the beginning of October.

Demographics 

According to the government census in 2009, both the population of Balamon Hindus and other Hindus were included which in total numbered 56,427.

Hindu Temples

There are 4,000 Hindus in Ho Chi Minh City, most are Bani Cham and a small minority of Indians. The Mariamman Temple, Ho Chi Minh City is their focal point for the Tamils. It is also considered sacred by many native Vietnamese and Chinese. It is also believed to have miraculous powers and is dedicated to the Hindu goddess Mariamman.

There are three Indian Hindu temples in Saigon (Ho Chi Minh City) - Sri Thendayuthapani temple, Đền Subramaniam Swamy temple and Mariamman Temple.

Ancient Cham Hindu Temples 

 Po Klong Garai Temple
 Po Nagar
 Mỹ Sơn

See also
Mariamman Temple, Ho Chi Minh City
Religion in Vietnam
Hinduism in Indonesia
Hinduism in Southeast Asia

References

 
Hinduism by country
Hinduism in Southeast Asia